Courrier may refer to:
Courrier International, a Paris-based French weekly newspaper
Courrier des États-Unis, a French language newspaper published by French immigrants in New York
Courrier d'Ethiopie, a French language weekly newspaper published in Addis Ababa during 1913-1936

See also
Courier (disambiguation)
Courrier sud (disambiguation)
Courrière, a village in the municipality of Assesse in the province of Namur, Belgium
Courrières, a commune in the Pas-de-Calais department in the Nord-Pas-de-Calais region of France